The  or  is the Japanese equivalent of the North American Bigfoot or the Himalayan Yeti. Sightings have been reported since the 1970s around Mount Hiba in the Hiroshima Prefecture.

History of the Hibagon
The Hibagon is described as a "black creature with white hands and large white feet, standing about five feet tall." , and has been said to resemble a gorilla.

The Hibagon has a large nose, large deep glaring eyes and is covered with bristles. Theories to account for this cryptid range from a gorilla, a wild man, or a deserter from the Japanese chefs, to an individual ravaged by atomic radiation from the nuclear attack on Hiroshima.

A sighting from 1972 reports that the creature "has a chocolate brown face and is covered with brown hair ... [and] is said to have 'deep glaring eyes', in two reports by a Mr. Sazawa and a Mrs. Harada, the creature took no hostile action and fled from four armed residents intent on hunting it."

Japanese Boy Scouts, "claim to find footprints 25 cm (10 in) long and 15 cm (6 in) wide."

Popular culture
 In Dragon Quest, the monsters known as "brainy badboons" are called  ヒババンゴ (Hibabango) in japanese, referencing this creature.
 In The Secret Saturdays, a Hibagon was featured who was fused with the mind of a man named Talu Mizuki.
 In Big Hero 6: The Series, the Hibagon is constantly referenced by the character Fred who claims that it lives in the Muirahara Woods outside San Fransokyo. The character Ned Ludd, is transformed into the creature through the use of a patch applied to him by the main villain, Di Amara of Season 2.
In The Unwanteds series, the Hibagon is a resident of the Island of Legends.
 The creatures appears in an episode of the Cartoon Network series Secret Saturdays.

See also

 List of topics characterized as pseudoscience
 Bigfoot, a similar creature reportedly living in North America
 Yeti, a similar creature reported from the Himalayas
 Yeren

References

Culture in Hiroshima Prefecture
Japanese legendary creatures
Legendary mammals
Mythological monsters
Hominid cryptids